Harold Black may refer to:
 Harold Stephen Black  - American electrical engineer
 Harold Black (artist)  - American artist
 Harold Black (civil servant)